This is a list of the National Register of Historic Places listings in Montgomery County, Texas.

This is intended to be a complete list of properties listed on the National Register of Historic Places in Montgomery County, Texas. There is one property listed on the National Register in the county; another was once listed but has been removed. The former property is a Recorded Texas Historic Landmark.

Current listing

The locations of National Register properties may be seen in a mapping service provided.

|}

Former listing

|}

See also

National Register of Historic Places listings in Texas
Recorded Texas Historic Landmarks in Montgomery County

References

External links

Montgomery County, Texas
Montgomery County
Buildings and structures in Montgomery County, Texas